Cole Bay is a northern hamlet in Saskatchewan's northern boreal forest. It is located on the southern shore of Canoe Lake. The population in the Canada Census of 2011 was 230, an increase of 47.4% over 156 in 2006.

Cole Bay shares its eastern border with Canoe Narrows and is near Jans Bay, which is also located on Canoe Lake. 

Highway 965 accesses the community. Highway 965 intersects Highway 155 at its eastern end and Highway 903 at its western end.

Demographics 

See also
 List of communities in Northern Saskatchewan
 List of communities in Saskatchewan

References 
 

Division No. 18, Saskatchewan
Northern hamlets in Saskatchewan